Associated Global Systems (AGS) began business in 1958, operating as a domestic and international air freight forwarder. On October 1, 2022, Associated Global Systems became a division of Nippon Express U.S.A., Inc.

Founded with the commitment to providing highly personalized and flexible services, AGS continues to custom tailor services for its clients. 

As a key member of the Nippon Express Group, AGS’ is part of one of the largest networks in the world that provide unparalleled services and customer support.

AGS’ “Whatever It Takes” approach is designed to meet and exceed service standards.

References

External links
 

Logistics companies of the United States
Companies based in New York (state)
Transportation companies based in New York (state)